The CSV qualification for the 2018 FIVB Volleyball Women's World Championship saw its member nations compete for two places at the finals in Japan. The winners of the 2017 Women's South American Volleyball Championship, plus the winners of the qualification tournament, qualified for the 2018 World Championship.

2017 South American Championship

Venue:  Coliseo Evangelista Mora, Cali, Colombia
Dates: 15–19 August 2017
The champions qualified for the 2018 World Championship.

Qualification tournament
Venue:  Coliseo Arequipa, Arequipa, Peru
Dates: 13-15 October 2017 
All times are Peru Time (UTC−05:00).
The winners will qualify for the 2018 World Championship.

|}

|}

References

2017 in women's volleyball
2018 FIVB Volleyball Women's World Championship